The 2013–14 season will be Újpest FC's 108th competitive season, 102nd consecutive season in the OTP Bank Liga and 128th year in existence as a football club.

First team squad

Transfers

Summer

In:

Out:

Winter

In:

Out:

List of Hungarian football transfers summer 2013
List of Hungarian football transfers winter 2013–14

Statistics

Appearances and goals
Last updated on 1 June 2014.

|-
|colspan="14"|Youth players:

|-
|colspan="14"|Out to loan:

|-
|colspan="14"|Players no longer at the club:

|}

Top scorers
Includes all competitive matches. The list is sorted by shirt number when total goals are equal.

Last updated on 1 June 2014

Disciplinary record
Includes all competitive matches. Players with 1 card or more included only.

Last updated on 1 June 2014

Overall
{|class="wikitable"
|-
|Games played || 44 (30 OTP Bank Liga, 8 Hungarian Cup and 6 Hungarian League Cup)
|-
|Games won || 14 (8 OTP Bank Liga, 5 Hungarian Cup and 1 Hungarian League Cup)
|-
|Games drawn || 14 (8 OTP Bank Liga, 3 Hungarian Cup and 3 Hungarian League Cup)
|-
|Games lost || 16 (14 OTP Bank Liga, 0 Hungarian Cup and 2 Hungarian League Cup)
|-
|Goals scored || 72
|-
|Goals conceded || 62
|-
|Goal difference || +10
|-
|Yellow cards || 84
|-
|Red cards || 8
|-
|rowspan="1"|Worst discipline ||  Dušan Vasiljević (8 , 1 )
|-
|rowspan="1"|Best result || 6–0 (A) v Baja – Magyar Kupa – 30-10-2013
|-
|rowspan="1"|Worst result || 0–4 (H) v MTK Budapest – OTP Bank Liga – 03-04-2014
|-
|rowspan="1"|Most appearances ||  Balázs Balogh (43 appearances)
|-
|rowspan="1"|Top scorer ||  Dušan Vasiljević (14 goals)
|-
|Points || 55/132 (41.67%)
|-

Nemzeti Bajnokság I

Matches

Classification

Results summary

Results by round

Hungarian Cup

League Cup

Group stage

Classification

Pre-season

References

External links
 Eufo
 Official Website
 UEFA
 fixtures and results

Újpest FC seasons
Hungarian football clubs 2013–14 season